is a Japanese former alpine skier who competed in the 1988 Winter Olympics.

External links
 

1961 births
Living people
Japanese male alpine skiers
Olympic alpine skiers of Japan
Alpine skiers at the 1988 Winter Olympics
Asian Games medalists in alpine skiing
Asian Games silver medalists for Japan
Alpine skiers at the 1986 Asian Winter Games
Medalists at the 1986 Asian Winter Games
20th-century Japanese people